Cleethorpes was a local government district in Humberside, England from 1974 to 1996. It was granted borough status in 1975. 
It was formed on 1 April 1974 and covered Cleethorpes itself along with a wider area including Humberston, Laceby, Stallingborough, New Waltham, and Immingham (formerly part of the Grimsby Rural District). Based at Cleethorpes Town Hall, it was abolished on 1 April 1996 (along with Humberside) when it was merged with the borough of Great Grimsby as the new unitary North East Lincolnshire.

References

History of Lincolnshire
Former non-metropolitan districts of Humberside
Former boroughs in England
Borough of